Susan Fry is an American author and editor.

During Fry's tenure as editor of Speculations, the magazine was twice nominated for the Hugo Award for Best Semiprozine, in 2001 and 2002.

Fry is a 1998 graduate of the Clarion West Writers Workshop.

References

Selected fiction
 Short story "The Big Shot" in The Phobos Science Fiction Anthology Volume 3
 Short story "The Bird of Paradise" (with Daniel Abraham), Asimov's, June 2003.

Year of birth missing (living people)
Living people
Women science fiction and fantasy writers
Place of birth missing (living people)
American magazine editors
American women novelists
American science fiction writers
American women non-fiction writers
Women magazine editors
21st-century American women